The Man with the Sad Face is an album by jazz saxophonist Stanley Turrentine recorded for the Fantasy label in 1976 and featuring performances by Turrentine with an orchestra arranged and conducted by David Van De Pitte. The album consists of Turrentine's versions of many current pop and disco hits.

Reception
The Allmusic review by Michael Erlewine simply stated "Very large group session for Fantasy".

Track listing
 "Evil Ways" (Clarence "Sonny" Henry) - 4:37
 "Man with the Sad Face" (Henry) - 4:21 		
 "Ligia" (Antônio Carlos Jobim) - 5:50
 "You'll Never Find Another Love Like Mine" (Kenny Gamble, Leon Huff) - 5:20
 "I Want You" (Arthur Ross, Leon Ware) - 3:39
 "Whatever Possessed Me" (Tadd Dameron) - 5:35
 "Love Hangover" (Marilyn McLeod, Pam Sawyer) - 3:48
 "Mighty High" (David Crawford, Richard Downing) - 0:54

Personnel
Stanley Turrentine - tenor saxophone
Jon Faddis, Lew Soloff, Tommy Turrentine - trumpet, flugelhorn
Wayne Andre, Tom Malone, Barry Rogers - trombone
Peter Phillips - bass trombone
Jim Buffington, Bob Carlisle - French horn
George Young - alto saxophone, flute, bass flute, piccolo
Lew Del Gatto - baritone saxophone, English horn, flute, oboe
Dave Carey - vibraphone (tracks 3, 5 & 7)
Paul Griffin - piano, electric piano
John Miller - piano (tracks 2 & 6)
Richard Trifan - synthesizer (tracks 1, 5 & 7)
Cornell Dupree, Eric Gale - guitar
Ron Carter (tracks 2 & 3), Buster Williams (track 6) - bass
Bob Babbitt - electric bass
Charles Collins - drums
Idris Muhammad - drums (tracks 2 & 6)
Errol "Crusher" Bennett - congas, percussion
Julius Brand, Norman Carr, Peter Dimitriades, Emanuel Green, Harold Kohon, Guy Lumia, Joseph Malignaggi, Gene Orloff, Raoul Poliakin, Tony Posk, Aaron Rosand - violin
La Mar Aslop, Julien Barber, Theodore Israel, Richard Maximoff, Mitsue Takayama - viola
Maurice Bialkin, Ted Hoyle, Jesse Levy, Anthony Sophos - cello
Gene Orloff - concertmaster
David Van De Pitte - arranger, conductor
Vivian Cherry, Lani Groves, Maeretha Stewart, Kenny Williams - backing vocals
Tony May - recording engineer, mixing engineer

References

1976 albums
Stanley Turrentine albums
Fantasy Records albums